Kenneth Edwards may refer to:

 Kenneth Edwards (golfer) (1886–1952), American golfer
 Kenneth Edwards (taekwondo) (born 1985), Jamaican taekwondo athlete
 Ken Edwards (born 1950), British poet
 Kent Edwards (c. 1918–1993), American actor and singer

See also
 Kenny Edwards (1946–2010), American singer, songwriter and musician